Rhectocraspeda is a genus of moths of the family Crambidae.

Species
Rhectocraspeda periusalis [Eggplant Webworm Moth] (Walker, 1859)

References
Citations

Sources
Natural History Museum Lepidoptera genus database

Pyraustinae
Crambidae genera
Taxa named by William Warren (entomologist)